Ockert Petrus van Zyl (born 17 August 1982) is a former South African rugby union player, that played first class rugby between 2004 and 2013. He played as a flanker or a lock.

Rugby career

Personal life

References

South African rugby union players
Living people
Rugby union players from Bloemfontein
Rugby union locks
Rugby union flankers
Cheetahs (rugby union) players
Free State Cheetahs players
Griffons (rugby union) players
Griquas (rugby union) players
1982 births